Patricia Gozzi (born 12 April 1950) is a French actress. She is best known for her starring roles in Sundays and Cybèle and Rapture. 

Hung Up was Gozzi's final film.

Filmography

References

External links
 

1950 births
Living people
French film actresses
20th-century French actresses